Kani Karim Yarvali (also Romanized as Kānī Karīm Yārvalī; also known as Kānī-ye Karīm Darmarān) is a village in Ozgoleh Rural District, Ozgoleh District, Salas-e Babajani County, Kermanshah Province, Iran. At the 2006 census, its population was 28, in 6 families.

References 

Populated places in Salas-e Babajani County